The Entre Rios Rugby Union  (also known by its initials UER) is the organisational body that governs the game of rugby union in Entre Ríos Province, Argentina.

The best placed teams of the UER qualify to play in the Torneo del Litoral along with clubs from the Rosario and Santa Fe unions.

History 
The Union was founded in 1979 when the rugby clubs of Paraná, Entre Ríos, decided to create their own body because they took part in the Unión Santafesina de Rugby. The founding members were Estudiantes de Paraná, Club La Salle, El Paraná Rowing Club and Tilcara.

Other clubs then asked to be part of the union from cities such as Diamante, La Paz, Concordia, Concepción del Uruguay, Gualeguay and Nogoyá.

Provincial team 
The Unión is represented in the Campeonato Argentino, a competition in which each of the 25 unions that make up the Unión Argentina de Rugby (UAR) participate. The Union's best result was reaching the final in the 1984 edition.

Member clubs 
Clubs affiliated to the Union as of June 2018:

References

External links
Official website

Cor
Sports organizations established in 1979
1979 establishments in Argentina